Zhao Yonghua (born 22 January 1969) is a Chinese female former track and field athlete who competed in the discus throw. She was a finalist at the 1991 World Championships in Athletics and the 1988 World Junior Championships in Athletics.

She was runner-up to compatriot Cao Qi at both the 1993 Asian Athletics Championships and the 1993 National Games of China.

International competitions

References

External links

Living people
1969 births
Athletes from Liaoning
Chinese female discus throwers
World Athletics Championships athletes for China
20th-century Chinese women